Sir Michael Gideon Marmot  (born 26 February 1945) is Professor of Epidemiology and Public Health at University College London. He is currently the Director of The UCL Institute of Health Equity. Marmot has led research groups on health inequalities for over thirty years, working for various international and governmental bodies.

Early life and education
Marmot was born in London on 26 January 1945. When he was a young child, his family moved to Sydney in Australia, where he attended Sydney Boys High School (1957–1961) and graduated with an MBBS medical degree from the University of Sydney in 1969.

He earned an MPH degree in 1972 and a PhD in 1975 from the University of California, Berkeley for research into acculturation and coronary heart disease in Japanese Americans.

Career
He was a member of the Royal Commission on Environmental Pollution for six years and in the New Year Honours 2000 he was knighted by Queen Elizabeth II, for services to epidemiology and the understanding of health inequalities.

Marmot advised the WHO. He was chair of the Commission on Social Determinants of Health (CSDH), which was set up by the World Health Organization 2005, and in August 2008 he produced for the commission a report called Closing the Gap in a Generation. 

Marmot gave the Harveian Oration in 2006.

He leads the English Longitudinal Study of Ageing (ELSA), and is engaged in several international research efforts on the social determinants of health. He served as president of the British Medical Association (BMA) from 2010 to 2011, and is the new president of the British Lung Foundation.

Marmot served as president of the World Medical Association for 2015–16.

Marmot was elected member of the Academia Europaea in 1995.

Marmot was appointed Member of the Order of the Companions of Honour (CH) in the 2023 New Year Honours for services to public health.

Memberships 
Marmot was elected as a fellow of the Royal College of Physicians (FRCP) in 1989. He became a fellow of the Faculty of Public Health (FFPHM) in 1989, a fellow of the Academy of Medical Sciences (FMedSci) in 2008, and was elected an honorary fellow of the British Academy (Hon FBA) also in 2008.

He has been furthermore elected an honorary fellow of the Royal Society of Public Health (Hon FRSPH) in 2008, an honorary fellow of the Royal College of Psychiatrists (Hon FRCPsych) in 2013, and an honorary fellow of the Faculty of Public Health (Hon FFPH).

Marmot is a Foreign Associate Member of the Institute of Medicine (IOM).

Research
Marmot conducted ground-breaking studies of heart disease and stroke, comparing Japanese people in Japan (high stroke rates, low heart attack rates) with those in Hawaii and California, where, especially in later generations, the disease patterns became reversed after adopting lifestyle, stress and diet changes. He has more recently led the Whitehall Studies of British civil servants, again focusing on heart disease and other disease patterns. His department includes the MRC National Survey of Health & Development, a longitudinal study directed by Professor Michael Wadsworth of people born in Britain in 1946 and followed up since. There are 120 other academic staff in the department.

Marmot has a special interest in inequalities in health and their causes, and has been a government advisor in seeking to identify ways to mitigate them. He served on the Scientific Advisory Group of the Independent Inquiry into Inequalities in Health chaired by Sir Donald Acheson, the former UK chief medical officer. This reported in November 1998.

In The Status Syndrome: How your social standing directly affects your health and life expectancy, he argues that socio-economic position is an important determinant for health outcomes. This result holds even if we control for the effects of income, education and risk factors (such as smoking) on health. The causal pathway Marmot identifies concerns the psychic benefits of "being in control" of one's life. Autonomy in this sense is related to our socio-economic position. Based on comparative studies, Marmot argues that we can make our society more participatory and inclusive to increase overall public health.

In 2008, Marmot appeared in Unnatural Causes: Is Inequality Making Us Sick?, an American documentary series examining the social determinants of health that drew heavily from Marmot's work on the Whitehall Studies.

On 6 November 2008, Prime Minister Gordon Brown announced that the Secretary of State for Health Alan Johnson had asked Marmot to chair a review of health inequalities in England; to inform policy making and address health inequalities from 2010. The review was announced at the launch of the Commission on Social Determinants of Health report Closing the Gap in a Generation. The review was published in 2010 entitled Fair society, healthy lives : the Marmot Review.

In 2020, Marmot co-authored Health Equity in England: The Marmot Review 10 Years On. It found that life expectancy is falling among the poorest people and particularly amongst women in certain English regions. Published in the same year, Build Back Fairer: The COVID-19 Marmot Review explored connections between inequality in socioeconomic conditions and COVID-19 death tolls, recommending investing in public health. In 2021, a follow up report looking at Greater Manchester noted a greater fall in life expectancy in the poorer areas of the county. It made recommendations around improving living standards, working conditions and increasing prospects for young people.

In 2022, Marmot warned of the risk of "a humanitarian crisis" the next winter caused by "fuel poverty", which could have long-term consequences mostly for the young and least well-off.

Selected bibliography

Books

Journal articles and research
Marmot, M (2021) Build Back Fairer in Greater Manchester
Marmot, M (2020) et al. Health Equity in England: The Marmot Review 10 Years On
Marmot, M (2010). Fair society, healthy lives : the Marmot review ; strategic review of health inequalities in England post-2010

Awards and honours 
 2016 Awarded an honorary doctorate by the Norwegian University of Science and Technology (NTNU).
 2015 C.-E. A. Winslow Medal, Yale
 2012 Lifetime Award Fellowship Eur Academy of Occupational Health Psychology
 2012 Patron of Medsin-UK
 2012 European Academy of Occupational Health Psychology Fellowship
 2011 Ambuj Nath Bose Prize, Royal College of Physicians
 2011 Medal of City of Lima, awarded by Mayor of Lima
 2011 Sir Liam Donaldson Lecture and Medal, Health Protection Agency
 2011 Fellow, Association for Psychological Medicine
 2011 Avedis Donabedian International Foundation Award
 2010 Manchester Doubleday Award, Manchester School of Medicine
 2010 Jenner Medal, Royal Society of Medicine
 2010–11 President, British Medical Association
 2008 Tore Andersson Award in Epidemiological Research, Karolinska Institutet,
 2008 William B. Graham Prize for Health Services Research
 2007 Centre for Disease Control (CDC) Foundation Hero Award
 2006 Winner BMA Book Awards 2006 (Public Health)
 2006 Harveian Oration, Royal College of Physicians
 2004 Balzan Prize for Epidemiology
 2004 Alwyn Smith Prize Medal for distinguished service to public health, Faculty of Public Health
 2004 Bisset Hawkins Medal, Royal College of Physicians
 2003 Visiting Fellow Commoner, Trinity College, Cambridge
 2002 Decade of Behaviour Distinguished Speaker, Gerontological Society of America
 2002 Patricia B Barchas Award, American Psychosomatic Society

References

External links

Tackling health inequalities: ‘Marmot cities’
Coventry:A marmot city

1945 births
British medical researchers
British Jews
British epidemiologists
British public health doctors
Jewish scientists
Knights Bachelor
Living people
People educated at Sydney Boys High School
Australian public health doctors
Medical doctors from Sydney
Sydney Medical School alumni
UC Berkeley School of Public Health alumni
21st-century English medical doctors
Members of the Order of the Companions of Honour
Fellows of the Royal College of Physicians
Fellows of the Academy of Medical Sciences (United Kingdom)
Academics of University College London
Honorary Fellows of the British Academy
Presidents of the British Medical Association
Members of the National Academy of Medicine
Ihsan Doğramacı Family Health Foundation Prize laureates